Second Genesis is the second album by jazz saxophonist Wayne Shorter recorded by the Vee-Jay label in 1960 but not released until 1974. It was his second session as leader, performing with his Jazz Messengers boss Art Blakey on drums, pianist Cedar Walton and bassist Bob Cranshaw. Walton joined Blakey's Messengers the following year, following the departure of Bobby Timmons.

Track listing 
All compositions by Wayne Shorter except where noted.
 "Ruby and the Pearl" (Ray Evans, Jay Livingston) – 5:53
 "Pay as You Go" – 3:39
 "Second Genesis" – 4:09
 "Mr. Chairman" – 3:13
 "Tenderfoot" – 3:24
 "The Albatross" – 5:21
 "Getting to Know You" (Oscar Hammerstein II, Richard Rodgers) – 4:16
 "I Didn't Know What Time It Was" (Lorenz Hart, Richard Rodgers) – 5:12

Bonus tracks on some CD reissues
"Ruby and the Pearl" [Take 2] (Evans, Livingston) – 7:40
 "Mr. Chairman" [Take 3] – 3:17
 "Tenderfoot" [Take 1] – 2:50
 "The Albatross" [Take 1] – 5:16
 "Getting to Know You" [Take 1] (Hammerstein, Rodgers) – 4:34

Personnel
Wayne Shorter – tenor saxophone
Cedar Walton – piano
Bob Cranshaw – double-bass
Art Blakey – drums

References

External links 
 Wayne Shorter - Second Genesis (rec. 1960, rel. 1974) album releases & credits at Discogs
 Wayne Shorter - Second Genesis (rec. 1960, rel. 1974) album to be listened on Spotify

1974 albums
Wayne Shorter albums
Vee-Jay Records albums
Hard bop albums